n-Butyl cyanoacrylate (n-BCA, NBCA), a cyanoacrylate ester, is a butyl ester of 2-cyano-2-propenoic acid. It is a colorless liquid with a sharp, irritating odor. It is insoluble in water. Its chief use is as the main component of medical cyanoacrylate glues. It can be encountered under various trade names, e.g. Cutseal, MediBond, MediCryl, PeriAcryl, GluStitch, Xoin, Gesika, VetGlu, Vetbond, LiquiVet, Indermil, LiquiBand, Histoacryl, IFABond, CutisSeal and others.  The generic international nonproprietary name (INN) for NBCA is enbucrilate.

In medical and veterinary applications, NBCA, isobutyl cyanoacrylate, and octyl cyanoacrylate are commonly used. They are bacteriostatic and their use is usually painless. Butyl esters provide stronger bond, but are rigid. Octyl esters, while providing weaker bond, are more flexible. Blends of octyl cyanoacrylate and n-butyl cyanoacrylate are available (such as GLUture) which offer both flexibility and a strong bond. n-Butyl cyanoacrylate is also used for embolization of cerebral arteriovenous malformations before their surgical treatment.

NBCA in monomer form is soluble in acetone, methyl ethyl ketone, nitromethane, and methylene chloride. It polymerizes rapidly in presence of ionic substances such as moisture, blood, or tissue fluids.

NBCA has unique properties compared to other cyanoacrylates such as octyl cyanoacrylate or isoamyl cyanoacrylate. The polymerized form has excellent tensile strength and is very effective in closing surgical or wound incisions.

The closure of the wound or cut is quick (about 30 to 45 seconds) and the product has inherently some valuable bacteriostatic properties. The cosmetic outcome of the closure is comparable or generally better than an equivalent suture substitute with least amount of scarring visible after three to six months.

Also important is the degradation properties of polymerized NBCA within the body. This property of NBCA has made it a very useful polymer to create various nanoparticles for delivery of drugs into the body with sustained release profiles.

Heating to higher temperatures causes pyrolysis and depolymerization of the cured glue, producing gaseous products strongly irritating to lungs and eyes.

Medical applications
The medical applications of butyl cyanoacrylate include its use as an adhesive for lacerations of the skin, and in the treatment of bleeding from vascular structures.  Butyl cyanoacrylate has been used to treat arteriovenous malformations by application of the glue into the abnormality through angiography.

In gastroenterology, butyl cyanoacrylate is used to treat bleeding gastric varices, which are dilated veins that occur in the setting of liver cirrhosis or thrombosis of the splenic vein.  The gastric varices are accessed by endoscopy, which uses a flexible fibre-optic camera to enter the stomach.  They are injected with a catheter needle inserted into the varix through the endoscope.  Other sites of varices, including esophageal varices, duodenal varices and colonic varices. Gastric varices have also been obliterated with recurrent injection treatment with butyl cyanoacrylate.

See also
 Isobutyl cyanoacrylate
 Methyl cyanoacrylate
 Ethyl cyanoacrylate
 Octyl cyanoacrylate

.Galil, K.A., Schofield, I and Wright, G.Z. (1980) Localization of cyanoacrylates in tissue sections.  International Assoc.               for Dental Res.  Joint meeting of Buffalo, Toronto, Western, and Rochester Chapters, Rochester, N.Y. Session #1, 7.
.Galil, K.A. and Wright, G.Z. Bonding of adhesive resins to acid etched enamel of primary tooth surfaces.  J. Dent Res.
                60: 313 #10, Special Issue.
..Galil, K.A., Schofield, I. and Wright. G.Z. (1981) Cyanoacrylate tissue adhesive detection in histological sections.  J.                 Dent. Res. 60: 561 #1005, Special Issue
.Galil, K.A., Schofield, I. and Wright, G.Z. (1981) A studies on incisional wound healing in hamster using N-Butyl-2-C
	Cyanoacrylate (Histoacryl Blue).  Intern. Assoc. for Dent. Res., Ontario Section. Joint meeting of Buffalo, Toronto
 	Western and Rochester Chapters, Ontario. Session # 2, 5.
.Galil, K.A., Wright, G.Z. and Schofield, I. (1982) Effect of N-Butyl-2 Cyanoacrylate (Histoacryl Blue) on the healing of  	skin wounds.  J. Dent. Res. 61: 258, # 718. Special Issue.
.Galil, K.A., Wright, G.Z. and Schofield, I. (1982) the response of hamster cheek pouches to cyanoacrylate tissue adhesive 	(Histoacryl Blue). J. Dent. Res. 61: 259, # 723. Special Issue.
.Marck, P.A., Cummins, J.E., Galil, K.A., Schofield, I. and Wright, G.Z. (1982) Weak mutagen city of an N-Butyl-
2-Cyanoacrylate tissue adhesive.  J. Dent. Res.  61:288, #983. Special Issue.
21.Pinto, J. and Galil, K.A. (1982) Epithelial wound closure in the oral cavity of the rat.  J. Dent. Res. 61: 307, #62. Special 	Issue
.Galil, K.A., Schofield, I.D. and Wright, G.Z. (1982) Isobutyl cyanoacrylate tissue adhesive (Histoacryl) as a surface an	adhesive in skin ulcers.  XII biennial Conference on Dental Res. ACFD/CADR. Dalhousie Univ., Halifax, Nova 	Scotia. ACFD/CADR 14:19 #11 Special Issues.  J. Dent. Res. 62: 445 #24 (1983) Special Issue
.Galil, K.A., Schofield, I.D. and Wright, G.Z. (1983) Effects of Histoacryl Blue on ulcers of hamster cheek pouch.  J.    D	Dent. Res. 62:245, #683.
.Ryall, L., Galil, K.A., Wright, G.Z. (1983) In vitro cytotoxicity of two Cyano-acrylates using the agar overlay Technique. 
 Int. Assn. Dent. Res., Lake Ont. Region, Buffalo, N.Y.  November. 7, # 10
.Galil, K.A., Schofield, I.D., Wright, G.Z. and Ryall, L.  (1984) Cytotoxic effect of two cyanoacrylates.  An in vitro study.  	I.A.D.R. meeting, Dallas, Texas.  J. Dent. Res. 63:325, #1389.
.Galil, K. A., Schofield, I.D. and Wright, G.Z. (1984). The effect of repeated application of tissue adhesive on the mucosa 	of the hamster cheek pouch.  I.A.D.R. meeting, Dallas, Texas. J. Dent. Res. 63: 324, #1382
.Galil, K.A. and Schofield, I.D. (1984) Evaluation of the biocompatibility of cyanoacrylate material (Histoacryl Blue) in 	hamsters.  Int. Assn. Dent. Res., Lake Ontario Region, Niagara-on-the-Lake, Ontario. October. 9, # 6.
.Way. D.C., MacPhee, C.A., and Galil, K.A. (1984) Comparing the polyacrylic acid technique with a conventional p	phosphoric acid etch bonding technique.  U.W.O. Research Conference, October. 2, # 4.
.Galil, K.A. and Schofield, I.D. (1985) A Study of possible oncogenic action of tissue adhesive-Histoacryl-blue by
Implantation in hamster and mice. J. dent. Res. 64: 304, # 1163.
.Schofield, I.D. and Galil, K.A. (1986) Local and systemic response to a tissue adhesive (Histoacryl blue). 9th 
International Conference on Oral and Maxillofacial Surgery, 90, # 24.
.Galil, K.A., Wright, G.Z. and Schofield, I.D. (1984) The healing of hamster skin ulcers treated with N-butyl-2-
      Cyanoacrylate (Histoacryl Blue). J. Biomed. Mater. Res. 18, 601-607.
.Galil, K.A., Scholfield, I.D. and Wright, G.Z. (1984) Detection of cyanoacrylate tissue adhesives in histological 
      Sections. J. Biomed. Mater. Res., 18, 609-616.
.Galil, K.A., Schofield, I.D. and Wright, G.Z. (1984) Effect of N-butyl-2-cyanoacrylate (Histoacryl Blue) on
     Healing of skin wounds.  J. Canad. Dent. Assn. 50, 565-569.
Vinters, H.V., Galil, K.A., Lundi, M. and Kaufman, J.C. (1985) Review article.  The Histotoxicity of cyanoacrylate.              Neuroradiology.  27, 279-291.

References

Cyanoacrylate esters
Monomers
Butyl compounds